Peder Flemström (born 18 February 1963) is a Swedish curler.

Teams

References

External links
 

1963 births
Swedish male curlers
Living people